Siona may refer to:
 Siona (moth), a genus of Geometer moth
 The Siona people of the Ecuadorian Amazon
The Siona language
 Siona Atreides, a fictional character in Frank Herbert's Dune universe
 Siona Shimshi (born 1939), Israeli painter, sculptor, ceramist, and textile designer